Badminton events for the 1969 Southeast Asian Peninsular Games were held at Rangoon, Burma between 6 to 13 December 1969. Competitions for only individual disciplines was conducted. Myint Myint Khin & Khin Than Nwe (Burma, Women's doubles) finished fourth. Malaysia won all five gold medals.

Medal winners

Final results

Medal table

References

Sources 
Lew Hon Kin: SEA Games Records 1959–1985, Petaling Jaya – Penerbit Pan Earth, 1986

External links 
HISTORY OF THE SEA GAMES, olympic.org.my

1969
1969 in badminton
1969 in Burmese sport
Badminton tournaments in Myanmar